Massachusetts House of Representatives' 5th Norfolk district in the United States is one of 160 legislative districts included in the lower house of the Massachusetts General Court. It covers part of Norfolk County. Democrat Mark Cusack of Braintree has represented the district since 2011.

Towns represented
The district includes the following localities:
 Braintree
 part of Holbrook
 part of Randolph

The current district geographic boundary overlaps with those of the Massachusetts Senate's Norfolk and Plymouth district and Norfolk, Bristol and Plymouth district.

Former locales
The district previously covered:
 Dorchester, circa 1872 
 Weymouth, circa 1927

Representatives
 George M. Browne, circa 1858 
 George Rankin, circa 1859 
 Edward H. R. Ruggles, circa 1858-1859 
 John Adams Holbrook, circa 1888 
 John Flint Merrill, circa 1888 
 Josiah Quincy, circa 1888 
 Prince H. Tirrell, circa 1920 
 Francis Richard Atkinson, circa 1951 
 William Augustine Connell, Jr., circa 1975 
 Mark Fitzsimmons
 Elizabeth Metayer
 Suzanne M. Bump
 Joseph C. Sullivan
 Joseph R. Driscoll
 Mark James Cusack, 2011-current

See also
 List of Massachusetts House of Representatives elections
 Other Norfolk County districts of the Massachusetts House of Representatives: 1st, 2nd, 3rd, 4th, 6th, 7th, 8th, 9th, 10th, 11th, 12th, 13th, 14th, 15th
 List of Massachusetts General Courts
 List of former districts of the Massachusetts House of Representatives

Images
Portraits of legislators

References

External links
 Ballotpedia
  (State House district information based on U.S. Census Bureau's American Community Survey).

House
Government of Norfolk County, Massachusetts